The Bloc Québécois Shadow Cabinet of the 42nd Canadian Parliament was announced in October 2015.

Members of Shadow Cabinet

Ouellet (February 28, 2018 - 2019)

Fortin/Ouellet (October 19, 2015-February 28, 2018)
On February 28, 2018, eight MPs resigned from the Bloc Québécois caucus: Michel Boudrias (Terrebonne), Rhéal Fortin (Rivière-du-Nord), Simon Marcil (Mirabel), Monique Pauzé (Repentigny), Louis Plamondon (Bécancour—Nicolet—Saurel), Gabriel Ste-Marie (Joliette), and Luc Thériault (Montcalm) citing conflict with party leader Martine Ouellet.

References

Bloc Québécois Shadow Cabinets